James Henry Thomas  (3 October 1874 – 21 January 1949) was a Welsh trade unionist and Labour (later National Labour) politician. He was involved in a political scandal involving budget leaks.

Early career and trade union activities
Thomas was born in Newport, Monmouthshire, the son of a young unmarried mother. He was raised by his grandmother and began work at twelve years of age, soon starting a career as a railway worker. He became an official of the Amalgamated Society of Railway Servants and in 1913 helped to organise its merger with two smaller trade unions on the railways to form the National Union of Railwaymen (now part of the National Union of Rail, Maritime and Transport Workers). Thomas was elected NUR general secretary in 1916, a post he held until 1931.

Thomas was general secretary during the successful national rail strike of 1919 that was jointly called by the NUR and Associated Society of Locomotive Engineers and Firemen against proposed wage reductions. In 1921 Thomas played a leading role in the Black Friday crisis, in which rail and transport unions failed to come to the aid of the National Union of Mineworkers, who were facing wage reductions. Before the 1926 General Strike the Trades Union Congress asked Thomas to negotiate with Stanley Baldwin's Conservative Government, but the talks were unsuccessful and the strike went ahead.

Political career
Thomas began his political career as a Labour Party local councillor for Swindon. He was elected to Parliament in 1910 as the Member of Parliament (MP) for Derby, replacing Richard Bell. He was re-elected in the 1918 general election and was considered as a potential candidate for the role of Chairman of the Parliamentary Labour Party and by extension Leader of the Opposition. He declined in order to focus on running the NUR, and the post went to William Adamson. 

He was appointed Secretary of State for the Colonies in the incoming Labour government of 1924 under Ramsay MacDonald. In the second Labour government of 1929 Macdonald wanted to appoint Thomas as Foreign Secretary, but the post was already desired by Arthur Henderson. Thomas was made Lord Privy Seal with special responsibility for employment. He rejected the Mosley Memorandum issued by junior ministers led by Oswald Mosley proposing public works programs and the expansion of Imperial Preference into an autarkic trade bloc to resolve interwar unemployment and poverty in 1930. Mosley subsequently resigned from the Cabinet, and in the ensuing reshuffle Thomas was reassigned to the post of Secretary of State for the Dominions. 

Thomas retained that position in MacDonald's National Government (1931–1935). As a result of joining the National Government he was expelled from the Labour Party and the NUR. For the first few months of the National Government in 1931 he also served as Colonial Secretary once more. One of the problems he had to cope with was the Australian cricket bodyline affair, which he said was one of the most difficult he faced.

Thomas served as Secretary of State for the Colonies once more from 1935 until May 1936, when he was forced to resign from politics. It was revealed that he had been entertained by stock exchange speculators and had dropped heavy hints as to tax changes planned in the budget. For example, while playing golf, he shouted "Tee up!", which was taken as a suggestion that the duties on tea were to rise.

Personal life
Thomas was made a Freeman of Newport in 1924. In May 2011 a casket given to him to celebrate the occasion was purchased at auction for Newport Museum.

Despite his humble origins he had a reputation for mixing well with all levels of society. Among the Labour ministers he was a favourite with George V. It was from laughing at a bawdy joke Thomas told the king that the latter split a post-operative wound from lung abscess surgery, delaying his recovery to near the 1929 General Election. Winston Churchill is said to have been in tears during Thomas's resignation speech as Colonial Secretary; and King Edward VIII recalled Thomas saying, as he returned his seals of office to the king, 'Thank God your old Dad never got to hear of this'. Thomas was known as a natty dresser, and was caricatured by the cartoonist David Low as "Lord Dress Suit".

After leaving parliament, Thomas served as company chairman of the British Amalgamated Transport Ltd.

Death
He died in London, aged seventy-four, in 1949. After cremation at Golders Green Crematorium, his ashes were buried at Swindon. His son Leslie Thomas became a Conservative Member of Parliament.

Literary references

Thomas is mentioned in Have His Carcase, a 1932 detective novel by Dorothy L. Sayers. Thomas's custom of wearing a dress suit is cited as an apparent certainty that could fail unlike the Second Law of Thermodynamics, which appears to govern the case in a metaphorical way.

In Lord Peter Wimsey, the 1975 BBC One production of Dorothy L. Sayers' 1931 novel Five Red Herrings, Thomas is mentioned in a snatch of background dialogue. A Scottish railway porter bursts out in an angry tirade: "You call this a Socialist Government? Things are harder than ever for a working man, and as for Jimmy Thomas, he has sold himself, lock, stock and barrel, to the capitalists!"

He is referred to in the comic song of 1932 by Norman Long, "On the Day that Chelsea went and won the Cup".  In a dream setting out the outlandish and impossible things that might happen on such an unusual day, the line is used "and De Valera put a statue of Jim Thomas on his lawn, on the day that Chelsea went and won the cup".

He is mentioned in "No Mean City" by A. McArthur and H. Kingsley Long, "Now he insisted on reading extracts from a speech by J. H. Thomas, declaring, moreover, that the railwaymen had never had abler leader" (page 89).

References

Bibliography

Further reading
 Blaxland, Gregory. J. H. Thomas: A Life for Unity  (1964).

External links 
 
 A short online biography of Jimmy Thomas.
 

1874 births
1949 deaths
Lords Privy Seal
Labour Party (UK) MPs for English constituencies
British Secretaries of State for Dominion Affairs
General Secretaries of the National Union of Railwaymen
National Labour (UK) politicians
Welsh trade unionists
People from Newport, Wales
Councillors in Wiltshire
UK MPs 1910
UK MPs 1910–1918
UK MPs 1918–1922
UK MPs 1922–1923
UK MPs 1923–1924
UK MPs 1924–1929
UK MPs 1929–1931
UK MPs 1931–1935
UK MPs 1935–1945
Members of the General Council of the Trades Union Congress
Members of the Parliamentary Committee of the Trades Union Congress
Presidents of the Trades Union Congress
Members of the Executive of the Labour and Socialist International
Secretaries of State for the Colonies
Members of the Privy Council of the United Kingdom
Amalgamated Society of Railway Servants-sponsored MPs
National Union of Railwaymen-sponsored MPs